Snelson may refer to:

Places
 Snelson, Cheshire, village in Cheshire, England

People
 George Matthew Snelson (1837–1901), considered the founding father of Palmerston North, New Zealand
 Kenneth Snelson, sculptor
 Wallace Eugene "Pete" Snelson, American politician